The European Mathematical Psychology Group (EMPG) is an informal association of scientists in mathematical psychology. The group was founded in 1971 in Paris; it has not been formally organized as a society, although has been described as the "European branch" of the Society for Mathematical Psychology. It holds a meeting each year in a European city, and beginning at the 23rd meeting, has published a proceedings from that meeting as an edited volume. As of 2001, there were approximately 100 attendees.

References

Psychology organisations based in Europe
Mathematical psychology
Scientific organizations established in 1971
1971 establishments in France